The Sadolin Sports Hall is a multi-purpose indoor arena complex in Rapla. It was opened in 2010 and is the current home arena of the Estonian Basketball League team Rapla KK.

References

External links
 Official website 

Sports venues in Estonia
Basketball venues in Estonia
Indoor arenas in Estonia
Buildings and structures in Rapla County
Rapla Parish
2010 establishments in Estonia
Sports venues completed in 2010